"Talk to Me", or "Talk to Me, Talk to Me", is a song written by Joe Seneca. Originally recorded in 1958 by Little Willie John, whose version reached No. 5 on the R&B chart and No. 20 on the Hot 100. "Talk to Me" was also recorded by Seneca in 1960.

Aretha Franklin recorded a version in 1968 during the sessions for her Soul '69 LP. It didn't make the album, but was released in 2007 on Rare & Unreleased Recordings from the Golden Reign of the Queen of Soul.

In 1982, Mickey Gilley had his fifteenth number one country hit with his version.

References

1963 singles
1983 singles
Mickey Gilley songs
Songs written by Joe Seneca
Song recordings produced by Phil Spector
Epic Records singles
1958 songs
King Records (United States) singles